This is a list of electoral results for the electoral district of Westernport in Victorian state elections.

Members for Westernport

Election results

Elections in the 1980s

Elections in the 1970s

References

Victoria (Australia) state electoral results by district